Jan Kromkamp (born 17 August 1980) is a Dutch former professional footballer who played as a right-back. He currently manages CSV Apeldoorn.

Kromkamp played a total of 201 games in the Eredivisie and scored eight goals in nine seasons, playing for both AZ and PSV. He also played in England and Spain, and started and finished his career at Go Ahead Eagles.

Kromkamp was included in the Netherlands squad for the 2006 World Cup.

Club career

Early years; AZ
Born in Makkinga, Friesland, Kromkamp made his professional debut for Go Ahead Eagles in Eerste Divisie, his first appearance in the competition being on 12 September 1998 in a 3–0 home win against FC Top Oss. He went on to play two full seasons with the team, scoring four goals in 33 games in his second.

Kromkamp moved to the Eredivisie with AZ for the 2000–01 campaign, being a regular first-team starter right away. In his fourth year he appeared in 34 league matches as the Alkmaar side finished fourth, thus qualifying for the UEFA Cup and going on to reach the semifinals in the continental competition.

Villarreal; Liverpool
At the start of the 2005–06 season, Kromkamp signed with Villarreal of Spain. On 29 December 2005, however, the La Liga club agreed on an exchange deal with Liverpool, with Josemi going in the opposite direction.

Kromkamp made his debut for the Reds on 7 January 2006, in a 5–3 win over Luton Town in the third round of the FA Cup. During his stint at Anfield, however, he was unable to dislodge Irish international Steve Finnan from the starting lineup, but did make a number of appearances from the bench, most notably in the domestic cup final; he was described as being a fair crosser of the ball with a lack of pace, who had difficulty in stopping opposition wingers getting crosses in.

PSV; Late career
Kromkamp played one league game for Liverpool in the 2006–07 season. On 31 August 2006, he was sold to PSV Eindhoven, taking over the number 2 jersey from André Ooijer who left for Blackburn Rovers. He appeared in 54 league games in his first two seasons combined, both ending in League championship wins, and also faced former club Liverpool in two UEFA Champions League matches, managing only one draw in four games.

From 2008 to 2010, Kromkamp featured rarely for the Eindhoven side due to injuries. On 22 February 2011 he rejoined his first professional team, Go Ahead Eagles – effective as of July – again in the second division.

On 23 June 2013, aged 33, Kromkamp announced his retirement from professional football due to chronic knee problems.

International career

Kromkamp was first called up by the Dutch national team under coach Marco van Basten, alongside the likes of Dirk Kuyt, Khalid Boulahrouz, Romeo Castelen, Barry Opdam, Hedwiges Maduro and Joris Mathijsen. He won his first cap on 18 August 2004 in a 2–2 draw in a friendly against Sweden and in the following year he established himself as the first-choice right-back.

Shortly after Kromkamp's move to Liverpool, however, van Basten admitted that he would rather see the player appear more regularly for his club – labelling the transfer as a bad move. Kromkamp hit back at this criticism by saying that he was very pleased to have joined Liverpool and that he would work hard to make it into van Basten's 2006 FIFA World Cup squad; in May 2006 the manager announced his final list of 23, which included Kromkamp, although he was not used during the tournament itself.

Career statistics

Club
Sources:

International
Source:

Honours
Liverpool
FA Cup: 2005–06

PSV
Eredivisie: 2006–07, 2007–08

References

External links

Stats at Voetbal International 

Liverpool historic profile

1980 births
Living people
People from Ooststellingwerf
Footballers from Friesland
Dutch footballers
Netherlands international footballers
Association football defenders
Go Ahead Eagles players
AZ Alkmaar players
PSV Eindhoven players
Villarreal CF players
Liverpool F.C. players
Eerste Divisie players
Eredivisie players
La Liga players
Premier League players
2006 FIFA World Cup players
Dutch expatriate footballers
Expatriate footballers in England
Expatriate footballers in Spain
Dutch expatriate sportspeople in England
Dutch expatriate sportspeople in Spain
FA Cup Final players